Jean-Laurent Mosnier ((Paris) 1743 – (Saint Petersburg) 10 April 1808) was a French painter and miniaturist.

Court painter under the Ancien Régime, Mosnier began, from 1789, a brilliant career as society painter in London, Hamburg and St. Petersburg. Many times academician, he left considerable work and high quality, both in miniature painting.

Self-Portrait with Two Pupils is thought to have been the basis for Jean-Laurent Mosnier's painting of himself with his young daughters. It is thought that his ambition was to clone the success of Adélaïde Labille-Guiard's painting.

Works

References

Book sources
 Jean-François Heim, Claire Beraud, Philippe Heim, Lounge painting of the French Revolution (1789-1799), Paris, CAC Publishing, 1989.
 Olivier Blanc, Portraits of Women: artists and models at the time of Marie Antoinette, Paris, Carpentier, 2006.

Links

1743 births
1808 deaths
18th-century French painters
French male painters
19th-century French painters
Painters from Paris
19th-century French male artists
18th-century French male artists